Leo William Emanuel Svedberg (born 17 March 1992) is a Swedish actor.

Selected filmography
1997 - Bill Bergson and the White Rose Rescue (Kalle Blomkvist och Rasmus)
1999 - Julens hjältar (TV)
1999 - Mamy Blue
1999 - Stora & små Mirakel
2002 - Karlsson på taket (film)
2004 - Veddemålet
2005 - Skattejakten

References

1992 births
Swedish male actors
Living people